The Jeep Wrangler YJ is the first generation of Jeep Wrangler four-wheel drive small off-road vehicles, rebadging and succeeding Jeep's CJ series, which was produced from 1944 to 1986. The first Wrangler (internally "YJ") was launched in 1986 and ran through 1995. Although the new Wrangler stood out from its CJ predecessors by its square headlights, its body was a direct evolution of the preceding CJ-7, and rode on the same wheelbase. The Wrangler featured an updated interior, offered more comfort and improved safety and handling, through a revised chassis that included a wider track and a slightly lower stance.

Development of a potential CJ-7 replacement was green-lit in 1982, with engineering and design work (under Chuck Mashigan) commencing. After approval earlier in 1983, a final design freeze occurred by the fall of 1983, with CJ-7 based mules being built in late 1983 and the first production body test prototypes in the spring of 1984. By late 1985, development concluded, as the transition from pilot to series production began. In February 1986 the 1987 model year Jeep Wrangler was unveiled. It entered production that March and went on sale on May 13, 1986.

History 

The Jeep YJ, sold as the Wrangler in the United States, replaced the Jeep CJ line in 1986 and was built in Brampton, Ontario, Canada, until the plant closed on April 23, 1992. Production was then moved to Toledo, Ohio, using the same plant that produced the  Willys Jeeps during World War II.

American Motors Corporation (AMC) had designed the new Jeep to be more comfortable on-road in an attempt to attract more daily drivers. It was a significantly new design with a wider track, slightly less ground clearance, more comfort and improved handling. The YJ still had leaf spring suspension similar to that of the CJ – however the springs were wider, and the first Wrangler sported trackbar suspension links and anti-roll bars for improved handling and safety, making it less easy to flip by untrained or unwary drivers.

Despite the new grille, the body is very similar to that of the CJ-7, and it is interchangeable with some minor modifications. The YJ also was given a larger windshield over the CJ. The YJs are easily identifiable due to the rectangular headlights and the fact that the wiper blades rest on the windshield, giving this version a distinctive look. The blades rested on the windshield due to the now wider arc of the blades to clean the larger windshield. These two changes were later removed when the TJ was launched 1996. 632,231 YJs were built through model year 1995, although YJs were still sold into mid-1996, bringing the total production number to 685,071 units.

The YJ used a 2.5 L AMC 150 I4 or optional 4.2 L AMC 258 I6 until 1990. Starting in 1991, a fuel-injected 190 hp (134 kW) 4.0 L AMC 242 variant replaced the 112 hp (84 kW) 4.2 L 258 CID straight-6. The NP207 transfer case was used only for 1987 and replaced by the NP231.

In 1988, the Sahara model debuted. 
The roll cage was extended in 1992 to allow for rear shoulder belts, Also that year, the YJ switched over to an electronic speedometer, outmoding the cable speedos on older YJs. Anti-lock brakes were added as an option in 1993. An automatic transmission option for 4-cylinder Wranglers came in 1994, as well as a standard center high-mounted brake light. Also, the clutch slave cylinder on manual transmission Wranglers was moved outside of the transmission's bellhousing to allow for easier replacement. In 1995, the Dana 30 larger U-joints were used [front axle U-joints (297x) and rear pinion U-joint (1330)].

There were no 1996 model year Jeep Wranglers. The last YJs were sold as 1995 model years but featured a few new parts not seen on any earlier YJ. This included the new TJ bumpstops on the hood (rubber boots vs the traditional U-bars), reinforced tailgate hinges, and some even had rear TJ bumpers. Some also got the newly tuned straight-6 engine that was designed to run quieter in preparation for the TJ.

Top options for YJ were the same as those offered on TJ. A Soft top with "half doors", featuring soft plastic zipper windows came standard (windows could be removed completely from these doors). Full-frame doors with conventional glass windows were optional on soft-top models. Hard tops with rear wiper and defroster were optional, but came standard with full-framed doors. The YJ featured large mirrors with manually adjustable arms on half-door models, while full-framed doors received smaller adjustable mirrors with fixed arms (which were mounted further away from the door corner, compared to the larger-style mirrors). Depending on year and interior color, Jeeps could be had with the top colors in black, white, tan and gray. Roll-bar padding normally matched top color, with the exception of white tops.

Powertrain

YJ Wrangler Islander 
From 1988 to 1993 Jeep produced an options package known as the "Islander". Several colors were offered, such as Bright Red, Pacific Blue, Malibu Yellow, Navajo Turqoise, and White, and both engines were offered.
Features of the package are as follows:
 Body-color wheel flares and side steps
 Sunset graphics on lower body and hood
 Islander logo on front fenders and spare tire cover
 Wrangler decals or embossments 
 Optional 20 gallon fuel tank
 Gray interior and highback seats
 Optional 5-spoke Alloy Wheels
 Floor carpeting
 Center console with cupholders
 Full or half doors

YJ Wrangler Renegade 

From October 1990 until 1994, Jeep produced an options package on the YJ Wrangler listed as the "Renegade Decor Group". Vehicles were shipped as optioned Wranglers to Autostyle in the Detroit area, where the Renegade Decor Package was installed, then shipped back to Jeep for delivery to dealers. Renegades all have a small sticker on the driver's side door, right above the latch denoting the visit to Autostyle. Initially, all Renegades were white, black, or red. Blue and bronze were added for the 1992 and 1993 model years, respectively. The Renegade Decor Group was a $4,266 option over a base Wrangler for 1991 and included special alloy wheels, exclusive body flares, along with many other features. Contents of the Renegade Decor Package include:

 4.0 Liter (242 CID) I-6 Engine
 30x9.5R15 LT OWL Wrangler A/T Tires
 Exclusive 5-hole aluminum wheels, 8 inches wide
 Full size spare tire
 Highback seats with Trailcloth Fabric
 Off-road gas shock absorbers
 Power steering
 Fog lamps (integrated into the front fenders)
 Leather-wrapped steering wheel
 Renegade striping (door letters)
 Floor carpeting (full width, and on insides of body tub)
 Floor mats, front
 Extra capacity fuel tank (20 US gal.)
 Color keyed fender flares with integrated bodyside steps
 Front and rear bumperettes (plastic)
 Center console with cup holders
 Courtesy and engine compartment lights
 Interval wipers
 Glove box lock

A hardtop was a $923.00 option and came with a mandatory rear window defroster at $164.00. Although soft-top models came standard with "half doors", full framed doors with glass windows were an option, and as on all 6-cylinder Wranglers, air-conditioning was also an option. Renegades typically had the tilt steering wheel ($130.00) and an AM/FM/cassette stereo radio ($264.00). A column shift automatic was also an available option, but it was not popular.

Trim levels 

North American YJ/Wranglers were available in the following standard trims.

 Base: also referred to as "S" & "SE" at different points in the model run; for the first few years the back seat and rear bumperettes were optional, some years the 6cyl engine was an option, other years only the 4cyl was available in the "Base" model. An AM radio (later AM/FM stereo) with two speakers came standard, as did high-back vinyl bucket seats and a heater and blower. An AM/FM stereo, cassette player, and air conditioning were optional. In 1986, a basic Wrangler Base cost $8,995 MSRP.
 Laredo: Chrome grille, bumpers, and trim, hard top and hard full doors, tinted windows, in 1988 cloth seats replaced the base model's vinyl, faux leather interior, body color fender flares and alloy wheels. An AM/FM stereo with cassette player, rear speaker sound bar, air conditioning, rear removable bench seat, and high-back cloth bucket seats all came standard.'LAREDO' decals adorned the hood on both sides or on the lower front fenders as part of the side stripes. 
 Islander: See Islander
 Sport: Which featured "sport" graphics and, beginning in 1991, a 4.0 L 242 CID inline-6-cylinder engine. An AM/FM stereo with two speakers and a rear removable bench seat came standard. A cassette player, rear speaker sound bar, cloth high-back bucket seats, and air conditioning were optional. 
 Sahara: Which came standard with most available options, including body color fender flares and steel wheels, also included with the Sahara edition are special green trail-cloth seats with storage pockets, interior door panels with pockets, front bumper mounted fog lamps, and plastic ends on the front bumper). An AM/FM stereo with cassette player, rear speaker sound bar, unique cloth-and-vinyl high-back bucket seats, rear removable bench seat, exterior color steel wheels were standard on this model. 'Sahara Edition' decals adorned both front fenders. 
 Renegade:  See Renegade.
 Rio Grande:  Available in champagne gold, moss green, white, along with the rare colors aqua pearl metallic, and Bright Mango; with a Pueblo themed interior trim package. This trim was only available in 1995, and was added to spice up the base 4-cylinder Wrangler 'S' models A cassette player, rear speaker sound bar, and cloth high-back bucket seats came standard, and air conditioning and alloy wheels were all available on this model. Red-and-orange 'Rio Grande' decals adorned both rear quarter panels.

References 

Wrangler (YJ)
Motor vehicles manufactured in the United States
Cars introduced in 1986
Cars discontinued in 2001